Fred V & Grafix were an English drum and bass duo made up of Frederick "Fred V" Vahrman (born 12 January 1990) and Joshua "Grafix" Jackson (born 14 June 1991). The duo was signed to Hospital Records and hailed from Devon, England. They have guested on BBC Radio 1 shows including Annie Mac. They released their debut album Recognise in 2014, which entered the UK Albums Chart at number 106. The album's second single "Forest Fires" (featuring Etherwood) entered the UK Singles Chart at number 77.

In December 2018, the duo announced their split and the continuation of their solo careers.

Discography

Studio albums

Extended plays

Singles

Remixes

Other appearances

References

External links
 Fred V & Grafix at Hospital Records
 
 

English electronic music duos
Electronic dance music duos
Drum and bass duos
Male musical duos
British drum and bass music groups
Musical groups established in 2009
Musical groups disestablished in 2018
Musical groups from Bristol